Citizens Common Front, was a political party in Mizoram, India. CCF was formed by a group of Christian leaders. Its chairman was Rev. Lalpianga. CCF contested the 1998 state assembly elections together with Mizo National Front (Nationalist) and Zoram Thar.

Defunct political parties in Mizoram
Year of establishment missing